Jacy J. Hurst is an American lawyer who has served as a judge of the Kansas Court of Appeals since August 2021.

Education

Hurst earned her Bachelor of Science in Business Administration with honors from the University of Kansas in 2002 and her Juris Doctor from the University of Kansas School of Law in 2006. In law school, Hurst was the Black Law Student Association treasurer, Student Bar Association third-year class vice president and the Kansas University Law Review staff member, 2005–06.

Career

She began her legal career in 2007 as a commercial litigator with the Kansas City law firm of Stinson LLP. In 2014, she became general counsel and chief compliance officer at Swope Health Services. From 2017 to 2021 she was of counsel and later partner at the Kansas City office of Kutak Rock, where she specialized in health care regulatory law. Hurst provided pro bono legal services to individuals in criminal and family law cases. In 2020, she became an adjunct professor at Washburn University School of Law.

Hurst became a member of the Kansas Board of Law Examiners in 2020.

Kansas Court of Appeals 

On February 11, 2021, Kansas Governor Laura Kelly appointed Hurst to be a judge of the Kansas Court of Appeals to fill the vacancy left by Judge Melissa Standridge who was elevated to the Kansas Supreme Court. She was confirmed on March 23, 2021 by the Kansas Senate, becoming the first woman of color to serve on the Court of Appeals. She was sworn in on August 13, 2021.

References

External links
Official biography at KS Courts

Living people
21st-century African-American women
21st-century American judges
21st-century American women lawyers
21st-century American lawyers
Year of birth missing (living people)
African-American lawyers
African-American judges
Kansas Court of Appeals Judges
Kansas lawyers
People from Lawrence, Kansas
University of Kansas alumni
University of Kansas School of Law alumni